Eugène Bercioux (1822 - 1898) was a 19th-century French playwright and poet.

Works 
1847: Les Arabesques, poems, 1847
1850: Nisus et Euryale, one-act comédie en vaudeville, with Léon Battu
1852: Mam'sell'Rose, one-act comédie en vaudeville, with Adrien Decourcelle
1854: Après la bataille, poetry, music by Ernest Boulanger
1855: Zamore et Giroflée, one-act comédie en vaudeville, with Charles Narrey
1856: La bonne d'enfant, one-act opérette bouffe, music by Jacques Offenbach
1858: Maître Baton, one-act operetta, music by Alfred Dufresne
1860: La Main du Seigneur, cantique, poem, music by Boulanger
1861: La Malédiction, poem, music by Boulanger
1878: la Fée Caprice, opéra comique in 2 acts and in verse, music by Achille Mansour
1883: La Nuit du bûcheron, ballade, music by Boulanger

Bibliography 
 Graham Robb, La poésie de Baudelaire et la poésie française: 1838-1852, 1993, (p. 253)

References

External links 
 Eugène Bercioux on data.bnf.fr
 Eugène Bercioux sur artlyriquefr (avec signature)

19th-century French dramatists and playwrights
19th-century French poets
Writers from Rouen
1822 births
1898 deaths